The Politburo of the 13th Congress of the All-Union Communist Party (Bolsheviks) was in session from 2 June 1924 to 1 January 1926.

Composition

Members

Candidates

References

Politburo of the Central Committee of the Communist Party of the Soviet Union members
Politburo
Politburo
Politburo
Politburo
Politburo